Group 2 of the 1962 FIFA World Cup took place from 30 May to 7 June 1962. The group consisted of Chile, Italy, Switzerland, and West Germany.

Standings

Matches
All times listed are local time.

Chile vs Switzerland
The game didn't start well for the hosts when in the sixth minute Rolf Wüthrich scored with a long-range shot taking advantage of a bad throw by Escuti. As Chileans increased the pressure after the goal Elsener had to make some fine saves. Contreras and Sánchez also hit the woodwork. Just before halftime the score was level when Sánchez's shot was deflected by Morf. Six minutes into the second half Jaime Ramírez put Chile ahead and soon after Leonel Sánchez scored his second goal and secured the victory for Chile.

West Germany vs Italy
This game saw not so many scoring chances for both sides. In the first half Uwe Seeler hit the bar, Albert Brülls and Omar Sívori also had their chances. In the second half the game became more physical and sometimes brutal but in the end defences overcame attacks and no goals were scored.

Chile vs Italy

The game was tough with much foul play. After only seven minutes Ferrini was sent off for kicking Landa and the game had to be interrupted for another eight minutes until the police escorted the Italian out of the field. Soon afterwards Leonel Sánchez responded to a series of kicks from Mario David by knocking him down with a punch in front of the linesman. The referee did nothing so David took revenge on Sánchez before halftime and was also sent off. Italians held out in the second half until Jaime Ramírez headed the ball into the net over two defenders after Sánchez's shot was punched away by Carlo Mattrel. In the last minutes Jorge Toro secured the Chilean victory with a long-range shot.

West Germany vs Switzerland
Switzerland were left with just 10 men early in the game when Norbert Eschmann suffered an ankle injury after a sliding tackle by Horst Szymaniak. Albert Brülls scored the first goal just before halftime with a low shot into the far corner. Fourteen minutes into the second half Uwe Seeler got a long pass from Hans Schäfer and beat the Swiss goalkeeper for the second time. Switzerland could answer only with a Schneiter goal after a corner At the end of the game Brülls had another good chance but his first shot was parried by the goalkeeper and his second shot was cleared off the line by Schneiter.

West Germany vs Chile

Italy vs Switzerland
Almost as soon as the game started Bruno Mora opened the score after Elsener deflected a crossshot by Pascutti. In the second half Giacomo Bulgarelli, a new member of the team, scored two consecutive goals and made undoubtable the Italian victory, though it was unable to prevent an early Italian elimination.

References

External links
 1962 FIFA World Cup archive

1962 FIFA World Cup
Italy at the 1962 FIFA World Cup
West Germany at the 1962 FIFA World Cup
Chile at the 1962 FIFA World Cup
Switzerland at the 1962 FIFA World Cup